North West Leicestershire  is a constituency represented in the House of Commons of the UK Parliament since 2010 by Andrew Bridgen, originally a Conservative but who sits as an Independent following his suspension in January 2023.

History
The constituency was created in 1983, and first won by the Conservative David Ashby. He stood down in 1997 and the seat was then won by Labour's David Taylor, who held the seat until he died of a heart attack in December 2009. Taylor had already announced that he would stand down at the 2010 general election. With the next election being due on 6 May 2010, it was considered uneconomic and (based on precedent) unnecessary to arrange a by-election. In the 2010 election, Andrew Bridgen took the seat for the Conservatives, with a swing of 12% from Labour to the Conservatives and with a smaller Lab-LD swing. Bridgen's majority was 7,511 or 14.5% of the total votes cast.

At the 2010 election, the BNP unusually succeeded in holding their deposit by winning more than 5% of the vote, and for the first time in the constituency they achieved fourth place.

Constituency profile 
North West Leicestershire's main settlements are the small towns of Coalville and Ashby-de-la-Zouch. The population is divided between Labour-inclined former mining areas with high rates of employment and low social housing dependency, and Conservative-inclined rural villages, with most people focused close to the two towns named. The seat has been a bellwether since 1983, as the winning party has formed the government.

This will be one of three large mines all operated by the main UK coal-extracting company.

Boundaries 

1983–1997: The District of North West Leicestershire, and the Borough of Charnwood wards of Shepshed East and Shepshed West.

1997–present: The District of North West Leicestershire.

North West Leicestershire constituency was created in 1983 from parts of the seats of Bosworth to the south and Loughborough to the east.

Members of Parliament

Elections

Elections in the 2010s

Elections in the 2000s

Elections in the 1990s

Elections in the 1980s

See also 
 List of parliamentary constituencies in Leicestershire and Rutland

Notes

References

Parliamentary constituencies in Leicestershire
Constituencies of the Parliament of the United Kingdom established in 1983